Standburn is a small village which lies within the Falkirk council area in central Scotland. The entire village is located along a section of the B825 road between Avonbridge and Loan.

The United Kingdom Census 2001 reported the population as 149 residents, a figure almost unchanged from the census of 1991

Drumbowie Environment Action Group is a charitable organisation which owns Drumbowie Park to the north of Standburn, this community woodland is open to the public.

Standburn was a mining community with several active pits until the 1950s. The pits were individually numbered and all prefixed by Gateside. The bings from the mining days can still be seen although the land has now been planted with trees and named Gateside Woodland.

See also
List of places in Falkirk council area

References

External links

Drumbowie Environment Action Group

Villages in Falkirk (council area)